Apoica pallida, known as the marimbondo-chapéu in Brazil, is a nocturnal eusocial wasp in the subfamily Polistinae.

See also
Apoica pallens

References

Vespidae
Hymenoptera of South America
Hymenoptera of Brazil
Insects described in 1791